Nationalist Canarian Centre (CCN) is a political party in the Canary Islands, founded in September 1992 as Independent Canarian Centre (CCI) by former Canarian President Lorenzo Olarte from splinter elements of the Democratic and Social Centre. It was a member of Canarian Coalition from 1993 to 19 November 2005.

Political parties in the Canary Islands
Political parties established in 1992
Centrist parties in Spain